Lower L'Ardoise is a small community in the Canadian province of Nova Scotia, located in Richmond County.

References
Lower L'Ardoise on Destination Nova Scotia

Communities in Richmond County, Nova Scotia
General Service Areas in Nova Scotia